Columbus Township is one of twelve townships in Bartholomew County, Indiana, United States. As of the 2010 census, its population was 45,578 and it contained 20,516 housing units.

History
The David Aikens House, D.W. Heagy Farm, New Hope Bridge, and James Marr House and Farm are listed on the National Register of Historic Places.

Geography
Camp Atterbury borders the township to the northwest.

Cities, towns, villages
 Columbus (south three-quarters)

Unincorporated towns
 Corn Brook
 East Columbus
 Everroad Park
 Flat Rock Park
 Forest Park
 Garden City
 Lowell
 North Columbus
 Parkside
(This list is based on USGS data and may include former settlements.)

Adjacent townships
 German Township (north)
 Flat Rock Township (northeast)
 Clay Township (east)
 Rock Creek Township (east)
 Sand Creek Township (southeast)
 Wayne Township (south)
 Ohio Township (southwest)
 Harrison Township (west)

Cemeteries
The township contains these five cemeteries: Carter, Garland Brook, Lambert, Mount Pleasant and Thompson.

Major highways
  Interstate 65
  U.S. Route 31
  State Road 7
  State Road 9
  State Road 11
  State Road 46

Airports and landing strips
 Bartholomew County Hospital Airport

Rivers
 Driftwood River
 Flatrock River

Lakes
 Crystal Lake
 Long Lake
 Terrace Lake
 Wood Lake

Landmarks
 Clifty Creek Park
 Donner Park
 Lincoln Park
 Noblitt Park
 Mill Race Park

School districts
 Bartholomew County School Corporation

Political districts
 Indiana's 6th congressional district
 State House District 57
 State House District 59
 State House District 65
 State Senate District 41

References
 United States Census Bureau 2007 TIGER/Line Shapefiles
 United States Board on Geographic Names (GNIS)
 United States National Atlas

External links

 Indiana Township Association
 United Township Association of Indiana

Townships in Bartholomew County, Indiana
Townships in Indiana